Elections to the Khasi Hills Autonomous District Council (KHADC) were held on 27 February 2020. The votes were counted on 2 March 2020 with the Indian National Congress emerging as the largest party in the council with 10 seats while the NPP and its ally UDP emerged as the ruling coalition with 7 and 6 seats respectively.

Schedule

Results
The counting was held on 2 March 2019. The INC emerged single largest party by winning 10 seats.

By Party

By Constituency

Members of the Executive Committee

The list of the Executive members are as follows:

References

2019 elections in India
Elections in Meghalaya
Autonomous district council elections in India